Unborn child may refer to:

 A human in any stage of prenatal development from fertilization to birth
 Unborn Child, an album by Seals and Crofts
 Unborn Child, a track on the album Acoustic - Lullabies Limited Edition by Lucien Nocelli

See also
 The Unborn (disambiguation)
 Unborn in the USA, a documentary about abortion